Telecommunications in Curaçao.

Telephone

The ITU international calling code for the country is +5999.

Radio

Terrestrial radio stations operating in Curaçao include the following.

FM radio

AM Radio

AM from nearby countries
Some radio stations from mainland Venezuela and Bonaire can be received in Curaçao:

Television

Operating television stations include:

Cable TV providers:
 Columbus Communications
 United Telecommunication Services (UTS) / TDS TV Distribution Systems N.V.

Over-the-top media services:
 Cariflix

Internet
 Country code:  .cw  (Curaçao West Indies)
 As of 2016, an estimated 138,750 people use the Internet in Curaçao, or 93.6% of the population.
 Internet service providers include UTS, FLOW, and Tres.

References

Curaçao
 
 
Curacao